Ricardo Roberto Barreto da Rocha (born 11 September 1962) is a Brazilian retired footballer who played as a central defender.

Club career
Rocha was born in Recife. During his career he represented Manchete Futebol Clube do Recife (then known as Associação Atlética Santo Amaro), Santa Cruz Futebol Clube, Guarani Futebol Clube, Sporting Clube de Portugal (having a brief spell with the Primeira Liga giants), São Paulo FC, Real Madrid – where he helped to the 1993 conquest of the Copa del Rey – Santos FC, CR Vasco da Gama, Olaria Atlético Clube, Fluminense FC, Newell's Old Boys and Clube de Regatas do Flamengo, retiring at nearly 37.

Rocha was coach of Santa Cruz in 2001 and 2007, without, however, the same success as a player.

International career
Rocha played 38 matches with the Brazilian national team in eight years, his debut coming on 19 May 1987 in an exhibition game with England (1–1). He went on to take part in two FIFA World Cups: 1990 and 1994.

In the latter edition Rocha was the starting center back. However, he could only appear 69 minutes for the eventual champions, a 2–0 group stage win against Russia, remaining injured for the remainder of the tournament. His last international match was also a friendly, a 5–0 win over Slovakia on 22 February 1995.

Honours

Club
Santa Cruz
 Campeonato Pernambucano: 1983

São Paulo
 Campeonato Paulista: 1989, 1991
 Campeonato Brasileiro Série A: 1991

Vasco
 Campeonato Carioca: 1994

Real Madrid
 Copa del Rey: 1992–93

International
Brazil
 FIFA World Cup: 1994
 Pan American Games: 1987
 Pre-Olympic Tournament: 1987
 Rous Cup: 1987

Individual
 Bola de Ouro: 1989
 Bola de Prata: 1986, 1989, 1991, 1993

References

External links
 Futpédia profile 
 
 
 
 

1962 births
Living people
Brazilian footballers
Association football defenders
Campeonato Brasileiro Série A players
Santa Cruz Futebol Clube players
Guarani FC players
Santos FC players
CR Vasco da Gama players
Olaria Atlético Clube players
Fluminense FC players
São Paulo FC players
CR Flamengo footballers
Primeira Liga players
Sporting CP footballers
La Liga players
Real Madrid CF players
Argentine Primera División players
Newell's Old Boys footballers
Brazil international footballers
1990 FIFA World Cup players
1994 FIFA World Cup players
1987 Copa América players
1991 Copa América players
FIFA World Cup-winning players
Brazilian expatriate footballers
Expatriate footballers in Portugal
Expatriate footballers in Spain
Expatriate footballers in Argentina
Brazilian expatriate sportspeople in Argentina
Brazilian expatriate sportspeople in Portugal
Brazilian expatriate sportspeople in Spain
Brazilian football managers
Santa Cruz Futebol Clube managers
Clube de Regatas Brasil managers
Pan American Games gold medalists for Brazil
Pan American Games medalists in football
Footballers at the 1987 Pan American Games
Medalists at the 1987 Pan American Games
Sportspeople from Recife